Martin Böttcher (17 June 1927 – 20 April 2019) was a German composer, arranger and conductor.

The beginning
Böttcher (on foreign records and articles often written "Bottcher" or "Boettcher", the latter being the correct transliteration of the German umlaut "ö") began taking piano lessons at an early age. But his first passion was flying, and he wanted to become a test pilot. Not yet seventeen years old, he got his military training in the German Luftwaffe. However, due to lack of fuel, he never went into action.

As a prisoner of war, Böttcher managed to get hold of a guitar and taught himself to play it. Following his release from captivity, he went to Hamburg. There he started his musical career with the then Nordwestdeutscher Rundfunk, in the dance and entertainment orchestra which had been newly founded by Willi Steiner, and which was held in high esteem in England.

He also gained important experience as an arranger for film composers, among them Michael Jary and Hans-Martin Majewski, for whom he arranged part of the music for Love '47.

Early years
In 1950, Böttcher, who liked to work on new sounds, recorded the first trick guitar pieces in Germany in the style of Les Paul. In 1954, Böttcher left the music stand and turned to manuscript paper. His talent did not escape the attention of the German film industry, which was just gaining new momentum at that time.

Thanks to film producer Artur Brauner, Böttcher made his cinematic debut in 1955, composing the music for the military satire The Captain and His Hero. His second film score turned out to be a milestone in German film history. Teenage Wolfpack directed by Georg Tressler and starring Horst Buchholz, met with tremendous success. Mr. Martin's Band comprised the top German jazz musicians, among them Horst Fischer, Fatty George, Bill Grah, Ernst Mosch and Hans 'James' Last.

Böttcher also composed for Hans Albers and for Heinz Rühmann's 'Father Brown' movies. Max the Pickpocket (1962) contained the track "Hawaii Tattoo" (recorded by "The Waikikis"), which Böttcher had written under the pseudonym of Michael Thomas. Within a short time, this theme became famous all over the world, and even received attention in the American Billboard charts.

The hit writer

Martin Böttcher found his greatest success in the 1960s composing the score for ten of the Karl May films, the first being Der Schatz im Silbersee with the famous "Old-Shatterhand-Melodie". The films starred, among many others, American actor Lex Barker and British actor Stewart Granger. The audience was enthusiastic about the wistful melodies, the fanfare-like music accompanying attacks, and the cheerful hillbilly tunes. Martin Böttcher's main themes from these films reached top positions in the German charts and sold thousands of records. The music for the Winnetou films is a landmark in German film music history. The success of these films, accompanied by Böttcher's music, made possible the "Spaghetti Westerns" with the music of Ennio Morricone.

With the German film industry declining at the end of the 1960s Martin Böttcher increasingly focused on working for German TV, which benefited from his talents in many films and series produced for TV.

In the 1970s Martin Böttcher wrote a number of successful scores, among them music for the TV series Sonderdezernat K1 and numerous episodes of Der Alte and Derrick, which are also known outside Germany. He again came in contact with the works of Karl May when he wrote the score for the 26-episode series Kara Ben Nemsi Effendi. The writer of Der Illegale (a TV mini-series), Henry Kolarz, said, "Even if I spoilt it, Böttcher's music is much too good for everything to go wrong."

Throughout the following years Martin Böttcher composed yet more evergreen themes for TV-series, such as [[Es muss nicht immer Kaviar sein (TV series)|It can't always be caviar]] (1977), Schöne Ferien  (Beautiful holidays) or Forsthaus Falkenau. In the 1990s, among others, Air Albatros took off - a very special project for the composer, as he could pay a musical tribute to his passion for flying. And when Pierre Brice mounted his horse again as Winnetou for the ZDF television station, he was, of course, accompanied by a score by Martin Böttcher.

Even the Americans became aware of him as an arranger and orchestra director. When they heard his renditions of the world-famous themes "Tara's Theme" and "Theme from 'A Summerplace'", Martin Böttcher was made an honorary member of the Max Steiner Society.

In 1998, the composer once more conquered the German charts. A band from Cologne, the "Superboys", scored a hit with a vocal version of the "Winnetou-Melodie" from the second Winnetou film. Their song "Ich wünscht' du wärst bei mir" ("Wish U Were Here") even reached the top of the ZDF television charts. Another cover version by the Czech group Těžkej Pokondr called "Vinetu" even received double-platinum in their country in March 2000.

The "master of tunes" was honoured in a very special way in 2002: as a jury member (Europäischer Förderpreis - a European talent award) Martin Böttcher represented Germany at that year's European Biennale for Film Music in Bonn.

Selected filmography

 The Captain and His Hero (1955)
 Teenage Wolfpack (1956)
 Lemke's Widow (1957)
 Thirteen Old Donkeys (1958)
 My Ninety Nine Brides (1958)
 The Woman by the Dark Window (1960)
 Pension Schöller (1960)
 The Black Sheep (1960)
 You Don't Shoot at Angels (1960)
 The Forger of London (1961)
 Our House in Cameroon (1961)
 Max the Pickpocket (1962)
 The Inn on the River (1962)
 He Can't Stop Doing It (1962)
 Street of Temptation (1962)
 Treasure of the Silver Lake (1962)
 The Black Abbot (1963)
 Apache Gold (1963)
 Mission to Hell (1964)
 The Phantom of Soho (1964)
 Last of the Renegades (1964)
 The Shoot (1964)
 Among Vultures (1964)
 The Oil Prince (1965)
 The Desperado Trail (1965)
 Old Surehand (1965)
 Winnetou and the Crossbreed (1966)
 Long Legs, Long Fingers (1966)
 Zärtliche Haie (1967)
 Creature with the Blue Hand (1967)
 The Monk with the Whip (1967)
 The Valley of Death (1968)
 Dr. Fabian: Laughing Is the Best Medicine (1969)
 Holidays in Tyrol (1971)
 Willi Manages The Whole Thing (1972)
 Bread and Stones (1979)

Awards
On 9 October 1995 the Deutsche Filmmusikpreise (German film music awards) were awarded at the Bonner Bundeskunsthalle. Martin Böttcher was honoured with the prize for his "outstanding contribution to German film history, which shows in an abundant musical oeuvre"; he was the very first person to receive this prize (in later years also Mikis Theodorakis and Ennio Morricone were among the recipients).
The continuous success of the Karl May melodies was the reason why, at the Karl May Festival in Bad Segeberg in 1997, Schacht Music Publishers honoured the tremendously successful composer with a "special award".
On 15 April 2000 Martin Böttcher received the "Edgar Wallace Award in Gold" for his merits in German crime movies.
On 25 January 2004 Martin Böttcher was awarded in St. Moritz the German Bundesverdienstkreuz (Federal Cross of Merit) for his lifetime achievement.
On 28 May 2009 Martin Böttcher was honoured in Berlin with the Deutsche Musikautorenpreis (German music authors’ award), category "composition for films".
On 27 June 2013 Martin Böttcher was honoured in Munich with the Look & Listen – Telepool-BR-Music-Award.

Literature

 Reiner Boller: Winnetou-Melodie - Martin Böttcher - Die Biographie''. Gryphon Verlag, 2003, 200 Seiten, mit einem Vorwort von Pierre Brice.

References

External links

Official homepage of Martin Böttcher
Discography of Martin Böttcher (English)

1927 births
2019 deaths
Musicians from Berlin
German film score composers
Male film score composers
German male composers
German male conductors (music)
Recipients of the Cross of the Order of Merit of the Federal Republic of Germany
21st-century German conductors (music)
21st-century German male musicians